This article lists the chairmen of the Supreme Soviet (Verkhovna Rada in Ukrainian) of Ukrainian SSR (1938–1991) and the chairmen of the Verkhovna Rada of Ukraine (since 1991).

List of chairmen

Chairmen of the Supreme Soviet of the Ukrainian SSR

Chairmen of the Verkhovna Rada of Ukraine
According to the parliamentary regulations, a chair person of the Ukrainian parliament during his or her term at the position, officially votes in the parliament among the non-affiliated group.

See also
Chairman of the Verkhovna Rada
Presidium of the Verkhovna Rada

Notes

References

External links
 
 Высшие органы государственной власти Украинской ССР (Supreme authorities of state power of the Ukrainian SSR).
 Handbook on history of the Communist Party and the Soviet Union 1898–1991.

Verkhovna Rada
Chairmen
Ukraine, Verkhovna Rada
Verkhovna Rada